This is a list of active/operating airlines that have an Air Operator Certificate issued by the Ente Nazionale per l'Aviazione Civile, the Civil Aviation Authority of Italy.

Scheduled airlines

Charter airlines

Cargo airlines

See also
 List of defunct airlines of Italy
 List of airlines
 List of airlines of Europe

References

External links
 

 
Airlines
Italy
Airlines
Italy